Loreto "Bonnie" Carbonell (1933 – 23 September 2017) was a Filipino basketball player who competed in the 1956 Summer Olympics.

Career

Playing career
Sometime during his early years, Father Richard Cronin, a Jesuit priest from the Ateneo de Davao University taught Carbonell the behind the back dribble technique. This would help to become a star player of the San Beda College varsity team. In 1956, he scored 48 points in an NCAA single match surpassing the previous scoring record of Carlos Badion of Mapúa. He also played for the YCO Painters of the Manila Industrial and Commercial Athletic Association.

National team career
Carbonell played for the Philippines men's national basketball team.

He helped the team win the bronze medal at the 1954 FIBA World Championship and was also part of the Leo Prieto-coached squad that participated at the 1956 Summer Olympics. He was also part of the team which defended their Asian Games title in the 1958 edition of the games. Carbonell played for the Philippine team which finished in eight place in the 1959 FIBA World Championship. He then led the team to a title a year later at the 1960 ABC Championship.

He failed to make it to the national team which competed 1960 Summer Olympics due to contracting sinusitis during the tryouts. He never played for the national team after that.

Coaching career
After his stint with the national team, Carbonell turned to coaching. At the 1974 MICAA Championship, he helped his old team YCO cause an upset over the Crispa Redmanizers. He aided the team of his alma mater, San Beda win two consecutive NCAA titles in 1977 and 1978. He would later help San Beda win another title. The Carbonell-coached Beer Hausen Brewmasters had a runner up finish in the 1984 PBA Second All-Filipino Conference losing to Great Taste in the final. He also coached the PBA team of Tanduay. He served as a consultant for San Beda until his death.

Death and legacy
He died on 23 September 2017 due to cardiac arrest.  He is part of the San Beda Sports Hall of Fame.

References

External links
 

1933 births
2017 deaths
Basketball players from Davao del Sur
Olympic basketball players of the Philippines
Basketball players at the 1956 Summer Olympics
Asian Games medalists in basketball
Basketball players at the 1958 Asian Games
Philippines men's national basketball team players
Filipino men's basketball players
1959 FIBA World Championship players
Asian Games gold medalists for the Philippines
Medalists at the 1958 Asian Games
San Beda Red Lions basketball players
Philippine Sports Hall of Fame inductees